Epes Sargent may refer to:
 Epes Sargent (poet) (1813–1880), American writer and editor
 Epes Sargent (soldier) (1690–1762), American soldier and landowner
 Epes W. Sargent (1872–1938), American vaudeville critic